Smythea is a genus of plants in the family Rhamnaceae.  It includes eleven species found in southeast Asia and Polynesia.

Species:

References

Rhamnaceae
Rhamnaceae genera
Taxa named by Berthold Carl Seemann